Lost may refer to getting lost, or to:

Geography
Lost, Aberdeenshire, a hamlet in Scotland
Lake Okeechobee Scenic Trail, or LOST, a hiking and cycling trail in Florida, US

History
Abbreviation of lost work, any work which is known to have been created but has not survived to the present day

Arts, entertainment, and media

Films

Lost (1950 film), a Mexican film directed by Fernando A. Rivero
Lost (1956 film), a British thriller starring David Farrar
Lost (1983 film), an American film directed by Al Adamson
Lost! (film), a 1986 Canadian film directed by Peter Rowe
Lost (2004 film), an American thriller starring Dean Cain
The Lost (2006 film), an American psychological horror starring Marc Senter
Lost (2023 film), an Indian Hindi-language thriller film

Games
Lost: Via Domus, a 2008 video game by Ubisoft based on the Lost TV series
The Lost (video game), a 2002 vaporware game by Irrational Games

Literature
Lost (Maguire novel), a 2001 horror/mystery novel by Gregory Maguire
Lost (Robotham novel), a 2005 Michael Robotham novel
Lost, Alice Lichtenstein's second novel
Lost: A Memoir, a 2009 memoir by Canadian author Cathy Ostlere
The Lost: A Search for Six of Six Million, a memoir by Daniel Mendelsohn
The Lost (Durst novel), a 2014 fantasy novel by American author Sarah Beth Durst

Music

Groups and labels
Lost (band), an Italian pop rock band
The Lost (band), a Boston garage rock band

Albums
Lost (8Ball album)
Lost (Carpark North album)
Lost (Cool Calm Pete album)
Lost (Died Pretty album)
Lost (Elegy album)
Lost (RTZ album)

Songs
"Lost" (The Badloves song)
"Lost" (Cold Chisel song)
"Lost" (Faith Hill song), 2007
"Lost" (Frank Ocean song)
"Lost" (Gorilla Zoe song)
"Lost" (Hunter Brothers song)
"Lost" (Lasgo song)
"Lost" (Linkin Park song), 2023
"Lost" (Menudo song)
"Lost" (Maroon 5 song), 2021
"Lost" (Michael Bublé song), 2007
"Lost" (Roger Sanchez song)
"Lost" (Skin song), 2003
"Lost" (Vassy and Afrojack song)
"Lost!", by Coldplay
"Lost", by Amanda Palmer & the Grand Theft Orchestra from Theatre Is Evil
"Lost", by Annie Lennox from Songs of Mass Destruction, 2007
"Lost", by Anouk from Hotel New York
"Lost", by Avenged Sevenfold from Avenged Sevenfold
"Lost", by the Box Tops from Cry Like a Baby
"Lost", by BTS from Wings, 2016
"Lost", by Chance the Rapper featuring No name from Acid Rap
"Lost", by The Church from Starfish
"Lost", by Clockwork Radio from State of Mind EP
"Lost", by the Cure from The Cure, 2004
"Lost", by Dead by April from Incomparable
"Lost", by Delain from April Rain
"Lost", by Dusty Springfield from A Brand New Me
"Lost", by Edge of Sanity from The Spectral Sorrows
"Lost", by Katy Perry from One of the Boys, 2008
"Lost", by Killswitch Engage from Killswitch Engage (2009 album), 2009
"Lost", by Korn from Life Is Peachy
"Lost", by Kreator from Cause for Conflict
"Lost", by Kris Allen from Horizons, 2014
"Lost", by the Meat Puppets from Meat Puppets II
"Lost", by Nevermore from The Politics of Ecstasy
"Lost", by Neurosis from Enemy of the Sun
"Lost", by Nik Kershaw from You've Got to Laugh
"Lost", by Orbital from Blue Album
"Lost", a 2019 song by Onlychild
"Lost", by Red from End of Silence
"Lost", by Robbie Williams from XXV, 2022
"Lost", by Stabbing Westward from Ungod
"Lost", by Tristania from World of Glass
"Lost", by Uriah Heep from Into the Wild
"Lost", by Van der Graaf Generator from H to He, Who Am the Only One

Television
Lost (game show), a short-lived reality television programme from 2001
Lost (TV series), an ABC drama about people who become stranded on a mysterious island
"Lost" (Stargate Universe), an episode of science fiction television series Stargate Universe
"Lost", an episode of the Canadian documentary TV series Mayday
"Lost", a first-season episode of Disney's So Weird
"The Lost" (Class), an episode of the first series of the Doctor Who spin-off series Class
Lost (South Korean TV series), a 2021 South Korean television series

Other uses
Local option sales tax
Mustard gas, originally known as Lost
Lost Generation, the social generational cohort that was in early adulthood during World War I

See also
 Loss (disambiguation)
 Lost Cause (disambiguation)
 Lost River (disambiguation)
 Lost Soul (disambiguation)
 Lost Souls (disambiguation)